The 2019−20 Bulgarian Cup was the 38th official edition of the Bulgarian annual football knockout tournament. The competition began on 4 September 2019 with the preliminary round and finished with the final on 1 July 2020 due to the COVID-19 pandemic in Bulgaria. Lokomotiv Plovdiv successfully defended the cup by winning on penalties against CSKA Sofia and qualified for the first qualifying round of the 2020–21 UEFA Europa League.

Participating clubs
The following 46 teams qualified for the competition:

Matches

Preliminary round
The draw was conducted on 23 August 2019. The games will be played between 4 and 6 September 2019. In this stage participated 15 winners from the regional amateur competitions and 14 non-reserve teams from Second League. During the draw, Botev Ihtiman received a bye to the first round.

Round of 32
The draw was conducted on 23 August 2019. The games will be played between 24 and 26 September 2019. In this stage participated the 15 winners from the first round, as well as the 14 teams from First League, the two best-placed teams from Second League (Septemvri Sofia and Montana), and the winner of the Cup of Bulgarian Amateur Football League (Balkan Botevgrad).

Round of 16
The draw was conducted on 2 October 2019. Originally the games were scheduled for the period between 29 and 31 October 2019. Due to the second round of the local elections in Bulgaria and the inability of the police to provide adequate security, those games were rescheduled for the period between 3 and 5 December 2019. In this stage the participants will be the 16 winners from the first round.

Quarter-finals
The draw was conducted on 10 December 2019. The games will be played on 3, 4 and 5 March 2020. In this stage the participants are the 8 winners from the Round of 16.

Semi-finals
The draw was conducted on 10 March 2020. The first legs should have been played between 7 and 9 April, while the second legs were scheduled for the dates between 21 and 23 April 2020. On 13 March 2020, the Bulgarian Football Union (BFU) suspended all games in Bulgaria until 13 April due to concerns over the coronavirus outbreak. On 6 April 2020 the BFU extended the match postponement until 13 May 2020. On 15 May 2020 the BFU declared its preparedness to resume the competition after the loosening of the state of emergency, related to the pandemic. After consulting the four semi-finalists it was decided to stage the semi-finals in two legs as originally planned. On 21 May the BFU scheduled the first legs of the semi-finals to be played on 9 and 10 June. On 15 June the BFU scheduled the second legs for 23 and 24 June. Both legs were held in stadiums with reduced capacities due to health regulations. For the first legs stadiums were allowed to host spectators up to 30% of their total capacity, as per regulation issued by the Ministry of Health on 2 June. For the second legs stadiums were allowed to host spectators up to 50% of their total capacity, but no more than 1,000 spectators per block, as per regulation issued by the Ministry of Health on 23 June.

First legs

Second legs

Final

The final took place at the Vasil Levski National Stadium in Sofia on 1 July 2020. On 27 June the Bulgarian Football Union announced that it is allowed for the stadium to host up to 30% of its total capacity (i.e. 12,000 spectators) with up to 3,000 spectators per block in accordance with the health regulations issued by the Ministry of Health.

Bracket

Top goalscorers

Notes

References

Bulgarian Cup seasons
Bulgarian Cup
Cup
Bulgarian